The Death of Jullebee Ranara, an Overseas Filipino Worker in Kuwait, was established to have occurred after her body was found buried in the desert on January 21, 2023. She was reportedly raped, murdered, burnt and thrown in the desert. The death revived public discourse on the plight of Filipino migrant workers living in Kuwait.

Background

Jullebee Ranara

Jullebee Cabilis Ranara (July 17, 1988 – January 21, 2023) was a 34-year old woman and an Overseas Filipino Worker (OFW) who was serving as a domestic worker for her last employer in Kuwait. Ranara got employed through the facilitation of Philippine-based employment agency Catalist International Manpower Services Company and its overseas counterpart in Kuwait, Platinum International Office for Recruitment of Domestic Manpower.

Death
She was found dead buried in the desert near Al-Salmi Road on January 21, 2023. Her corpse was found burnt with her head 
smashed. An autopsy by Kuwait authorities determined she was pregnant at the time of her death. She was allegedly murdered and raped.

She reportedly called her family shortly prior to her death expressing that she was afraid of her employer's 17-year old son.

Her family have refused to accept blood money or make a settlement with those associated with the alleged perpetrator.

Repatriation and burial of body
The body of Ranara was repatriated to the Philippines on January 27, 2023 with expenses shouldered by her employers. The Philippines' National Bureau of Investigation (NBI) started its own autopsy the following day. The body was buried on February 5, 2023 at the Golden Haven Memorial Park in Las Piñas.

Suspect
Kuwait authorities managed to arrest a suspect, a 17-year old Kuwaiti national, in less than a day Ranara was found dead. The suspect was determined to be the son of the employer of Ranara.

Previous cases and Kuwait–Philippine relations

In 2018, a diplomatic crisis between Kuwait and the Philippines arose following the killing of Joanna Demafelis. President Rodrigo Duterte directed a deployment ban for migrant workers to Kuwait. The ban was partially lifted when a deal concerning the protection of migrant workers was struck in May of that year. However Demafelis' death was followed by the cases of Constancia Lago Dayag (2019) and Jeanelyn Villavende (2020) who were killed by their employers.

Reactions

Kuwait
On January 29, 2023, Kuwaiti Foreign Minister Sheikh Salen Abdullah Al-Jaber Al-Sabah condemned the killings and expressed condolence to Ranara's family. He added that the perpetrator's actions do not in any way reflect the character and values of Kuwaiti society, the Kuwaiti people and the Kuwaiti government.

Philippines

The Department of Migrant Workers (DMW) led by secretary Susan Ople on January 24 said that they were not considering a total deployment ban for Filipino migrant workers seeking to work in Kuwait finding the Kuwait authorities' actions on the case swift although the department is looking to impose additional safeguards. Most of the Filipino workers work 20 hours per day seven days a week no day off, both governments Filino are Kuwait do not comply the international labor law and international labor laws, no health insurance, no 8 hours a day, these Muslim countries even no pay additional extra hour of work. We must be stop all these labor injustice these treatment is only slave system. That is why we need to support the total ban to Muslims countries. 

Senator Jinggoy Estrada urged an intensified campaign to advocate for the abolishment of the kafala system in Arab nations.Senator Raffy Tulfo on January 29, called for a total deployment ban, saying it would be better to just allow Filipinos to work in places where they are treated better such as in Guam.  He also demanded the Kuwaiti government to issue a public apology to the Filipino people. Senators JV Ejercito and Joel Villanueva also called for a deployment ban.

Meanwhile some legislators in the Committee on Overseas Workers Affairs of the House of Representatives are calling for an investigation on Ranara's recruitment agency, the Catalist International Manpower Services Company. They intend to determine whether the agency is involved in irregular and illegal activities.

President Bongbong Marcos visited the wake for Ranara on January 30, and vowed to extend help and engage with bilateral talks with the Kuwaiti government on the matter.

On February 8, 2023, the DMW imposed a deferral on the deployment of newly hired Filipino household service workers bound to Kuwait. The DMW also issued a preventive suspension on Catalist International's operations as well as intends to file a case against Catalist International and its Kuwaiti counterpart, the Platinum International Office for Recruitment of Domestic Manpower.

References

2023 in international relations
2023 in Kuwait
2023 in the Philippines
January 2023 crimes in Asia
Deaths by person in Asia
Human rights abuses in Kuwait
Migrant workers
Kuwait–Philippines relations